Irresistible Catherine (French: L'irrésistible Catherine) is a 1957 French comedy film directed by André Pergament and starring Michel Auclair, Marie Daëms and Fernand Sardou.

Cast
 Michel Auclair as Georges Bartone
 Marie Daëms as Catherine Revering
 Fernand Sardou as Bouche
 Robert Vattier as Me Revering
 René Bergeron as Le colonel
 Lil Carina as La choriste
 Catherine Cellier as Une entraîneuse
 Jean Clarieux as Le boucher
 Robert Dalban as La voix de Pearl
 Julia Dancourt as Une entraîneuse	
 Nane Germon as Mme Martin
 Albert Hugues as Le pianiste
 Abel Jores as Le barman
 Maïa Jusanova as La danseuse
 Robert Le Fort as Victor
 Jean Ozenne as Lorre
 Floriane Prévot as Rosette
 Gisèle Robert as Miss Grenelle

References

Bibliography 
 Goble, Alan. The Complete Index to Literary Sources in Film. Walter de Gruyter, 1999.

External links 
 

1957 films
1957 comedy films
French comedy films
1950s French-language films
Films directed by André Pergament
1950s French films

fr:L'irrésistible Catherine